Freedom at the Edge is an Assamese language short film by Aneisha Sharma based on a real-life story.

Synopsis
The story is about a youth named Machal Lalung from Middle Assam, who was charged and imprisoned in various Indian jails without trial for 54 years. Indra Bania played the lead role.

Awards
Aneisha Sharma won the "Indie Spec Best Documentary Award" for the film at the 2007 Boston International Film Festival, and received the Kerala State Award for Best Documentary in 2007.

The film was also screened at the 2008 Cannes Film Festival, and as part of the 2008 Mumbai International Film Festival

Cast
Indra Bania as Machang Lalung, whose name in real life was Machal.

See also
Jollywood

References

External links
The Director’s blog

2007 short films
2007 films
Indian short films
Films set in Assam
2000s Assamese-language films